Guozhen railway station is a station on Longhai railway in Chencang District, Baoji, Shaanxi.

History
The station was opened in 1936.

Passenger services at this station used to be suspended, and was resumed on 1 April 2016. It was announced the station would be renamed as Chencang railway station, but the name remains unchanged as of September 2018.

References

Railway stations in Shaanxi
Stations on the Longhai Railway
Railway stations in China opened in 1936